An orthogonal wavelet is a wavelet whose associated wavelet transform is orthogonal.
That is, the inverse wavelet transform is the adjoint of the wavelet transform.
If this condition is weakened one may end up with biorthogonal wavelets.

Basics 
The scaling function is a refinable function.
That is, it is a fractal functional equation, called the refinement equation (twin-scale relation or dilation equation):
,
where the sequence  of real numbers is called a scaling sequence or scaling mask.
The wavelet proper is obtained by a similar linear combination,
,
where the sequence  of real numbers is called a wavelet sequence or wavelet mask.

A necessary condition for the orthogonality of the wavelets is that the scaling sequence is orthogonal to any shifts of it by an even number of coefficients:
,

where  is the Kronecker delta.

In some cases the opposite sign is chosen.

Vanishing moments, polynomial approximation and smoothness 

A necessary condition for the existence of a solution to the refinement equation is that there exists a positive integer A such that (see Z-transform):

 

The maximally possible power A is called polynomial approximation order (or pol. app. power) or number of vanishing moments. It describes the ability to represent polynomials up to degree A-1 with linear combinations of integer translates of the scaling function. 

In the orthogonal case, A and Ã coincide.

A sufficient condition for the existence of a scaling function is the following: if one decomposes , and the estimate

Examples

 Suppose  then , and the estimate holds for n=A-2. The solutions are Schoenbergs B-splines of order A-1, where the (A-1)-th derivative is piecewise constant, thus the (A-2)-th derivative is Lipschitz-continuous. A=1 corresponds to the index function of the unit interval.

A=2 and p linear may be written as 

Expansion of this degree 3 polynomial and insertion of the 4 coefficients into the orthogonality condition results in  The positive root gives the scaling sequence of the D4-wavelet, see below.

References
 Ingrid Daubechies: Ten Lectures on Wavelets, SIAM 1992.
 Proc. 1st NJIT Symposium on Wavelets, Subbands and Transforms, April 1990.